The Thomas-Morse MB-4 was a prototype American mailplane of the 1920s. It was of unusual design, being a biplane with twin fuselages housing the crew of two and a central nacelle which carried the aircraft's twin engines in a push-pull configuration.

Design and development
The MB-4 was designed to meet a June 1919 specification from the United States Post Office Department for a two- or three-engined mailplane, required to carry 1,500 lb (682 kg) of mail on a single engine. Thomas-Morse chose to use as much as possible of its existing Thomas-Morse MB-3 fighter in order to reduce costs, using two engineless MB-3 fuselages to carry the crew and cargo, with the pilot in a cockpit in the nose of the port fuselage and the co-pilot/mechanic in a similar cockpit in the nose of the starboard fuselage, while cargo was carried behind the crew in each fuselage. Two 300 hp (224 kW) Wright-Hisso H V8 engines were mounted in a central nacelle between the two main fuselages in a push-pull configuration, with fuel tanks mounted between the engines.

The MB-4's three-bay biplane wings were all new, with ailerons on the upper wing. It had a conventional tailwheel undercarriage and had two separate tail assemblies, which were standard MB-3 empennages.  Dual controls were fitted, with the pilot able to disconnect the co-pilot's controls, but there were no means of communication between the two cockpits.

Operational history
The MB-4 made its maiden flight in February 1920. While the aircraft had reasonable speed for the time, it was otherwise poor, with one fuselage tending to take-off before the other, while the engines caused severe vibration which overloaded the aircraft's structure. It was described as the "worst thing on wings" by Jerome Fried, the general plant superintendent of Thomas-Morse.

One aircraft was tested by the US Post Office, but was not used for mail services, and was scrapped in 1921. At least one MB.4 (and possibly 3) was delivered to the United States Army Air Service where it was stored before being scrapped.

The MB-4 was a failure, having extremely poor flying characteristics and being described as the "worst thing on wings", and saw no service other than the trials by the manufacturer, US Army and the US Post Office.

Specifications

See also

References
Notes

Bibliography
Eberspacher, Warren. "Thomas-Morse MB-4". Excerpts from AAHS Journal, Vol. 46, No. 3 - Fall 2001.
"New York Aero Show". Flight, 1 April 1920, pp. 370–373.
Wegg, John. General Dynamics Aircraft and their Predecessors. London:Putnam, 1990. .

External links

"Airisms from the Four Winds". Flight, 25 March 1920. p. 350. (Contains two photos of the MB-4).

1920s United States cargo aircraft
Thomas-Morse aircraft
Twin-engined push-pull aircraft
Twin-fuselage aircraft
Aircraft first flown in 1920